Italia turrita ("Turreted Italy") is the national personification or allegory of Italy, in the appearance of a young woman with her head surrounded by a mural crown completed by towers (hence turrita or "with towers" in Italian). It is often accompanied by the Stella d'Italia ("Star of Italy"), from which the so-called Italia turrita e stellata ("turreted and stellate Italy"), and by other additional attributes, the most common of which is the cornucopia. The allegorical representation with the towers, which draws its origins from ancient Rome, is typical of Italian civic heraldry, so much so that the wall crown is also the symbol of the cities of Italy.

Italia turrita, which is one of the national symbols of Italy, has been widely depicted for centuries in the fields of art, politics and literature. Its most classic aspect, which derives from the primordial myth of the Great Mediterranean Mother and which was definitively specified at the turn of the 16th and 17th centuries by Cesare Ripa, wants to symbolically convey the royalty and nobility of Italian cities (thanks to the presence of crown turrita), the abundance of agricultural crops of the Italian peninsula (represented by the cornucopia) and the shining destiny of Italy (symbolized by the Stella d'Italia).

Appearance and representation

The personification of Italy is generally depicted as a woman with a rather luxuriant body, with typical Mediterranean attributes, such as colored complexion and dark hair. Throughout history it has repeatedly changed the attributes with which it is characterized: a bunch of wheat ears in hand (symbol of fertility and reference to the agricultural economy of the Italian peninsula), a sword or a scale, metaphors of justice, or a cornucopia, allegory of abundance; during fascism it also supported one of the symbols of this political movement, the fasces.

After the birth of the Italian flag, which occurred in 1797, it is frequently shown with a green, white and red dress. Above the head of the towered Italy is often depicted a five-pointed star, the so-called Stella d'Italia (symbolizing the shining destiny of Italy), which since the Risorgimento is one of the symbols of the Italian peninsula, from 1948 the dominant element of the emblem of the Italian Republic. The association of the star with Italy is first found in the Iliupersis of Stesichorus, and then in the works of Virgil and other poets. It was added above the personification of Italy in the late imperial era.

However, the classic representation of Italia turrita, originated from a coin minted under the Roman emperor Antoninus Pius, the exhibition sitting on a globe and holding a cornucopia and a scepter in his hand. Over the centuries the iconography of the towered Italy had a constant evolution with the addition and elimination of various attributes: the final version of the personification of the Italian peninsula was defined at the turn of the 16th and 17th centuries thanks to Cesare Ripa.

The classical aspect of Italia turrita, which originates from the primordial myth of the Great Mediterranean Mother, symbolically transmits, according to the presence or absence of some attributes, the royalty and nobility of Italian cities (thanks to the turreted crown), the abundance of the agricultural crops of the Italian peninsula (represented by the cornucopia), the natural wealth of the Italian peninsula (symbolized by the rich mantle), the domination of Italy over the world (symbolized by the globe, which is the allegory of the two periods during which the Italian peninsula was at the center of history: the Roman era and the Rome of the popes), domination over other nations (represented by the scepter) and Italy's shining destiny (thanks to the presence of the Italian Star).

Places of representation
Italia turrita has been depicted throughout history in many national contexts: stamps, honors, coins, monuments, on the passport and, more recently, on the back of the Italian identity card.

The allegory of Italy is also present in the scrolls of numerous ancient maps. On maps she appeared for the first time in 1595 on a map contained in the Parergon, a geographical work by Giacomo Gastaldi; then on a work by Willem Blaeu published in 1635, with the wall crown surmounted by a luminous six-pointed star. Among the most striking images of the personification of the Italian peninsula is that shown in the general map of Italy by Jean-Dominique Cassini, which was published in 1793.

History

In ancient Rome 

The origin of the turreted woman is linked to the figure of Cybele, a deity of fertility of Anatolian origin, in whose representations she wears a wall crown. During the Second Punic War (218 BC - 202 BC), while Hannibal was raging in Italy, the Roman priests predicted that Rome would be saved only if the image of Cybele, that is of the goddess of Mount Ida, had arrived in the surroundings of Troy. The image, a black stone preserved in Pessinus, was transported to Rome and placed inside the Temple of Victory. The Roman army then defeated Hannibal and the city was saved.

Since then Cybele became one of the deities of Rome, the Magna Mater ("Great Mother"), although his cult was opposed because it contained orgiastic rites. The importance of Cybele in the Roman religion became very strong when Virgil wrote the Aeneid (31 BC - 19 BC), telling how the journey of Aeneas was also protected by the goddess, who provided the wood of the trees and saved the ships from the fire of Turnus.

Also thanks to the events of the Social War (91 BC - 88 BC), which saw opposing Rome and the Italic municipia, the figure of Cybele then began to represent the idea of a peaceful and united Italy under Roman rule, as Aeneas had pacified the Latin peoples, as well as the sacred space of the pomerium, now extended to the whole peninsula. It was during the Social War that the allegorical personification of Italy manifested itself for the first time: it appeared on a coin minted by Corfinium, an Italic city antagonistic to Rome, although not yet provided with the turreted crown.

Later, during the Roman Empire, the women of the imperial family began to dress, in official depictions, as Cybele, that is, with a turreted crown. This image merged with the previous allegorical personification of the Peninsula, that of Corfinium, increasingly becoming the symbol of Italy, especially in the Anatolian and Eastern Greek provinces. The representation of Italia turrita was proposed under the emperor Trajan, who wanted it to be sculpted on the Trajan's Arch erected in Benevento in 114–117, and also on one of the two Pluteos called anaglypha, four years later.

Afterwards, from 130 AD on, under the emperors Hadrian, Antoninus Pius, Marcus Aurelius, Commodus, Septimius Severus and Caracalla, Roman coins reproduced the allegorical representation of Italy as a dressed and towered woman who sometimes carries a cornucopia. During the reign of Antoninus Pius a sestertius was coined representing Italy as a turreted woman, sitting on a globe and holding a cornucopia in one hand while in the other the command stick.

The towered crown is the symbol of Civitas romana, therefore the allegory shows the sovereignty of the Italian peninsula as a land of free cities and of Roman citizens to whom a proper right has been granted: the Ius Italicum. This will then become the classic image of the allegorical personification of Italy.

From the Middle Ages to 18th century

In the centuries following the fall of the Western Roman Empire, the Italian peninsula lost its political and administrative unity, shattering into multiple autonomous state. In the early Middle Ages period, the personification of Italy in a turreted woman almost completely disappeared from the collective imagination, limiting itself to appear rarely but without having those distinctive features, such as the walls or the cornucopia, which had so characterized it in Roman times.

Italia turrita was rediscovered at the beginning of the 14th century, shortly after the Medieval commune, when the first signoria began to be born. From the Middle Ages the allegorical depiction of Italy began to transmit torture and despair: the country, in fact, was no longer the absolute protagonist of those important political and military events that they had characterized ancient Roman history so much, but it was relegated to a simple province of the Holy Roman Empire. This personification of Italy, however, is not associated with the entire peninsula, but only with territories that were de jure part of the Kingdom of Italy, which were split into numerous de facto independent states that were experiencing convulsive political phases that needed, according to many, a peacemaker. 

The representation continued to be nostalgic of past glories even during the Renaissance and Humanism, as well as during the descents of foreign armies in the Italian Wars of the 16th century. In 1490, Ludovico Sforza, duke of Milan, had an Italia turrita painted on a medallion of the castle in Piazza Ducale, Vigevano. The Caesaris Astrum appeared again in 1574 on the cover of Historiarium de Regno Italiae, a book written by the historian Carlo Sigonio.

The first to resume a figure of Italia turrita more similar to that of the ancient age was Cesare Ripa in the 17th century, who describes it, in his Iconologia, as in the sestertius of Antoninus Pius, also combining them with a star that shines above his head: the reason for this association lies in the fact that in ancient Greece Italy was joined by the Star of Venus, being the Italian peninsula located west of Greece. The Star of Venus is in fact visible on the horizon, immediately after sunset, in the west. Cesare Ripa definitively specified the characteristics of the Italia turrita, characteristics that have come down to us:

In response to the criticisms made by European travelers on the Grand Tour that focused on Italian culture - judged to be retrograde - and on the poverty of the Italians in the face of the country's monumental and artistic wealth, Italian intellectuals of the 18th century they reacted by becoming bearers of a change that led to the birth of less asphyxial movements and richer in cultural ferment. These events also had repercussions on the representation of towered Italy, which became the "protector of the arts".

From the unification of Italy to republican Italy
Italia turrita recovered the solemn aura in the 19th century, becoming one of the symbols of the Italian unification, during which it was often represented as a prisoner, that is, subjected to the foreign powers that dominated the country at the time, or extolling the call to arms with the aim to encourage the Italian people to actively participate in the process of unification of the country; the iconography of the allegorical personification of Italy, during the Italian unification period, was also used in propaganda vignettes for political purposes.

It is from this period that most of the marble statues representing Italia turrita were built; the erection of monuments to the allegorical personification of the country continued even after the three wars of independence.

When unity of Italy was completed, the iconography of the Italia turrita was overcome by the myth of the history of ancient Rome; it is not in fact a case that in the group of statues present at the Altare della Patria in Rome the allegorical personification of Italy surrounded by a mural crown with towers is absent.

This tendency to relegate Italia turrita to a supporting role, which began in 1870 with the capture of Rome, was also confirmed during fascism, which made the call of Roman history one of the cornerstones of the regime.

In these decades the allegorical representation of Italy was not particularly widespread in the official architecture, with the placement of statues inside the most important buildings, but was limited to the marble monuments realized in various Italian cities, to the philatelic emission and to propaganda, especially those related to the initial neutrality and the subsequent participation of Italy in the First World War.

The iconography of the allegorical personification of Italy was resumed in the second post-war period: in 1946 the supporters of the republic chose the effigy of the Italia turrita as their unitary symbol to be used in the electoral campaign and on the referendum card on the institutional form of the State, in contrast to the Savoy coat of arms, which represented the monarchy.

After the proclamation of the Republic, which saw Italia turrita as the protagonist, the iconography of the allegorical representation of the country returned to sporadic appearances; appeared on stamps (including the series called "Siracusana"), coins, stamp duty and cartoons.

Stella d'Italia 

Over the head of Italia turrita, a five-pointed star is usually seen shining radiant; an ancient secular symbol of Italy purported to protect the nation, known as Stella d'Italia ("Star of Italy"). Iconographic of the Italian unification, it was used as the crest of the armorial bearings of the Kingdom of Italy from 1870 to 1890 and is the dominant element in the modern day emblem of Italy adopted at the birth of the Italian Republic in 1948. The Stella d'Italia symbolizes the shining destiny of Italy.

Cornucopia 

Prior to the conceptualization of Italia turrita, Roman Italy was often personified as a woman holding a cornucopia, symbol of wealth and abundance. Such symbolism continued and several coins depicted Italia turrita, seated on a globe, holding a sceptre and a cornucopia.

Gallery

See also 
 Emblem of Italy
 National personification
 Mural crown
 Stella d'Italia
 Roma (mythology)

Notes

Citations

References 

 
 Giovanni Lista, La Stella d'Italia, Edizioni Mudima, Milan, 2011.

External links 
 The front page of La Domenica del Corriere on 25 May 1958 depicted Italia turrita voting in that day's general election

National personifications
Italian culture
National symbols of Italy